Steven Henry Johnson (26 January 1929 – 9 July 2009) was a British field hockey player. He competed in the men's tournament at the 1956 Summer Olympics.

References

External links
 
 

1929 births
2009 deaths
British male field hockey players
Olympic field hockey players of Great Britain
Field hockey players at the 1956 Summer Olympics